Leopoldo Laborde (born November 6, 1970) is a Mexican film director, screenwriter, photographer, editor and self-made producer.

Laborde entered the movie business in 1984 as a production assistant in Mexico City.  From 1988 to 1995, starting with El gato, he shot four feature films on home-video and developed his skills as a storyteller as well as his cinematic visual aesthetics, namely with Utopía 7. In 1997, he began his professional career in 35-millimeter film format with Angeluz, a horror film, released at the 1998 Guadalajara International Film Festival.  Despite the criticisms, upon his return to Mexico City, he wrote and shot Sin destino and Un secreto de Esperanza, throughout 1999 to 2002. The starring actors were, respectively, Roberto Cobo and Katy Jurado, these two films being the last acting performances they gave.  Sin destino is known as “a key piece in raw realism”, and Un secreto de Esperanza won twelve awards in film festivals around the world.  Laborde also alternated with other works in digital video format, such as Cuerpo prestado, La repetición and Los tréboles no pueden soñar, throughout 2000 to 2004.  During 2005, he wrote, edited and directed Enemigo, this time with debutant performers, and in 2007, Un hombre y su morada interior.

Laborde is known for his particular vision and great versatility in movie styles.

Filmography
Cuatro paredes (2010)
Recuerdos olvidados (in post-production since 2009)
La puerta (in post-production since 2008)
Enemigo (in post-production since 2007), started in 2005
Un secreto de Esperanza (2002), also known as A Beautiful Secret (International: English title)
Sin destino (2002), also known as Without Destiny
Cuerpo prestado (2001)
Recompensa (2000), or 72 horas, aired in 1999
Inesperado amor (1999), aired in 1999
Angeluz (1998), also known as Angel of Light
La extraña presencia (1995)
El libro de la selva... de asfalto (1995)
Utopía 7 (1995)
Juego de niños (1995), also known as A Child's Play, aired in 1994
Perseguido (1993) (V), also known as Chased, aired in 1993
Nathael (1993)
El gato (1992), started in 1988

Connections
Roberto Trujillo (born on July 8, 1979): head of Utopía 7 Films, the production company for several of Laborde's films
for both:  and 
Marilú Carrillo: producer, agent, set hand or cast member of five Laborde films
for technical credit only: ,  and Nathael
for performance credit or more:  and 
also party to films without Laborde, such as casting for 
Nelly Godoy: agent or cast member of four Laborde films:
for technical credit only:  and 
for performance credit or more: , Perseguido and Nathael
Gloria Ruíz: producer, manager or agent of four Laborde films:
, Angeluz,  and 
also party to films without Laborde, such as writing and producing 
Laborde (Omicrón Films) and Trujillo (Utopía 7 Films) have had something of a troupe, throughout their careers, the actors being:
Rogelio Castillo, in Utopía 7† and Juego de niños (the brother)

★ lead performance and protagonist played (including antagonist)
† performance as member of a team of protagonists

In addition to starring in Sin destino, as Sebastian; Roberto Cobo had a minor part in Un secreto de Esperanza, as Melquíades, the groundskeeper for Esperanza's home. And one Mariana Gajá, a character actress but star of Sin ton ni Sonia, played the blonde object of sexual or romantic fixation of the protagonist, both in Sin destino and Un secreto de Esperanza, respectively as Angelica and Madonnita. She and Sheilla Lissette bear some resemblance.

See also
Roberto Trujillo on Spanish Wikipedia
Inesperado amor on Spanish Wikipedia
Inesperado Amor on Portuguese Wikipedia

References

External links

Leopoldo Laborde + at the Mexican Film Directors Sections of the Union of Cinema Production Workers (STPC)
Leopoldo Laborde Vasconcelos at the Sonorous Mexican Cinema Writers index at the National Autonomous University of Mexico (UNAM)

Most Relevant Videos of Leopoldo Laborde at Mashpedia
Leopoldo Laborde nos habla de sus proyectos, Laborde Leopoldo talks about his projects

1970 births
Living people
Mexican film directors
Mexican screenwriters
Mexican people of French descent